The Idaho State Bengals men's basketball team represents Idaho State University in the Big Sky Conference in NCAA Division I. Currently led by head coach Ryan Looney, the Bengals play their home games on campus at Reed Gym in Pocatello, Idaho. Prior to the 2019–20 season, home games were primarily at Holt Arena, with Reed as a secondary venue.

Idaho State Bengals coaches list

Postseason

NCAA tournament results
The Bengals have appeared in eleven NCAA Tournaments and have a cumulative record  The team came to national prominence as a member of Rocky Mountain Athletic Conference (RMAC) under head coach Steve Belko, who arrived in 1950 and stayed for six seasons, followed by John Grayson for the next three. Belko left for Oregon, Grayson for Washington.

In the sixth season under head coach Jim Killingsworth, Idaho State advanced to the Elite Eight in 1977. It was a 32-team field, and remains the furthest any Big Sky team has advanced in the NCAA tourney. The Bengals won an opening round game at home at the Minidome and then upset second-ranked UCLA by a point in the Sweet Sixteen in Provo, Utah.  entered the game with records  After the high-scoring loss to fourth-ranked UNLV in the regional final, Killingsworth left for Oklahoma State.

Through 2023, Idaho State has not participated in the National Invitation Tournament (NIT).

NAIA Tournament results
The Bengals appeared in one NAIA Tournament, with a record of 1–1.

Idaho State Bengals in the NBA/ABA
 Ron Boone (SG), 1969–1981, 4 x All-Star, 1041 consecutive games
 Jeff Cook (PF), 1980–1988
 Greg Griffin (SF), 1978–1978
 Steve Hayes (C), 1981–1986
 Charles Parks (F), 1969–1969
 Dale Wilkinson (PF), 1985–1985

References

External links